Flight Lieutenant William George Searle White  (10 February 1913 – 1969) was a rugby union player who represented Australia.

White was born in Mackay, Queensland and played lock in club rugby for the University of Queensland Rugby Club. He made his debut for Queensland in 1931. Two years later he made his debut for the Wallabies, becoming the 286th player to do so and the sixth from the UQ rugby club. White played total of 10 tests for Australia which included 4 Bledisloe Cup matches.

When World War II broke out, White joined the Royal Australian Air Force. On 10 March 1944, White was awarded the Distinguished Flying Cross for "courage, coolness and unflagging enthusiasm on sorties."

References

1913 births
1969 deaths
Sportspeople from Mackay, Queensland
Australian rugby union players
University of Queensland Rugby Club players
Australia international rugby union players
Rugby union locks
Royal Australian Air Force personnel of World War II
Royal Australian Air Force officers
Recipients of the Distinguished Flying Cross (United Kingdom)
Date of death missing
Rugby union players from Queensland